The present tense is a grammatical tense.

Present Tense may also refer to:

Literature
Present Tense, defunct Jewish affairs magazine

Music 
 Present Tense (band), a Las Vegas band

Albums 
 Present Tense (Sagittarius album), 1968
Present Tense (James Carter album), 2008
 Present Tense (Wild Beasts album), 2014
Present Tense, 1979 album by the American rock band Shoes
Present Tense, 1990 album by Joe Locke, and the title song
Present Tense, 1992 album by Bobby Watson, and the title song
Present Tense, 1995 album by Lenny White
Present Tense, 1996 album by José Feliciano
Present Tense, 2015 album by Any Trouble

Songs 
 "Present Tense", a song by Pearl Jam from the album No Code
 "Present Tense", a song by Radiohead from the album A Moon Shaped Pool
 "The Present Tense", by Geddy Lee

Television 
 "Present Tense" (Arrow), a 2019 episode of Arrow

See also 
 Future tense (disambiguation)
 Past tense (disambiguation)